Fernando Cardenal Martínez (26 January 1934 – 20 February 2016) was a Nicaraguan Jesuit and liberation theologian.

Family
Fernando Cardenal was born into a wealthy and influential family in Granada, Nicaragua, as the fifth son of Rodolfo Cardenal and Esmeralda Martinez. One of his brothers is Ernesto Cardenal, a Nicaraguan Catholic priest, poet and politician. He is also a first cousin of the poet Pablo Antonio Cuadra.

Nicaraguan Revolution
Born in Granada, Nicaragua, he served as Minister of Education from 1984 to 1990, during the Sandinista era. His brother Ernesto Cardenal served as Minister of Culture from 1979 to 1987.

Because of his ties to the leftist Sandinistas and liberation theology, he was forced to leave the Society of Jesus, and, together with his brother Ernesto, he had his priesthood suspended directly by Pope John Paul II.

In an open letter published in 1984 he wrote: "I cannot conceive of a God that would ask me to abandon my commitment to the people […] From my point of view, and from my personal experience, it is possible to live […] simultaneously (in) fidelity to the church as a Jesuit and as a priest, and also devote myself to the service of the poor in Nicaragua from within the Sandinista revolution." Cardenal left political office in 1990, and was subsequently reinstated into the Jesuit order in 1997.

In 1980, Cardenal led the Nicaraguan Literacy Campaign, a Sandinista effort that succeeded in teaching basic literacy to more than half a million people with the help of 60,000 young volunteers.

Later life

Fernando Cardenal was a director at the Fe y Alegría organization in Managua, Nicaragua. He was readmitted as a Jesuit and resumed activities as a priest in 1997, after four years had passed since he renounced his membership in the Sandinista National Liberation Front (the Sandinistas). Cardenal helped to provide education for the poor in Nicaragua.

Cardenal made several visits to Jesuit universities in the United States, including the University of Detroit Mercy in 2013, and the John Carroll University in 2014. He talked there about his commitment to help the poor and his experience as a Jesuit priest and liberation theologian during the Nicaraguan Revolution. He gave several interviews to discuss his involvement in the Nicaraguan Revolution as a minister of education, his commitment to the poor, and the state of education in Nicaragua which links to his involvement in Fe y Alegría. He gave an interview to an undergraduate student at Georgetown University in 2014.

Death

Cardenal died in Managua on February 20, 2016. His funeral was held February 21, 2016 at the Jesuit-run Central American University in Managua.

See also

References

External links

 Fernando Cardenal as a Jesuit Priest 
 Interview with Fernando Cardenal from Georgetown University

1934 births
2016 deaths
Catholicism-related controversies
Liberation theologians
Ministers of Education of Nicaragua
Nicaraguan Jesuits
Nicaraguan Roman Catholic priests
People from Granada
Nicaraguan Christian socialists
Former Jesuits